Khatijah Surattee (born 5 February 1950) is a Singaporean sports shooter. She competed in the women's 10 metre air pistol event at the 1988 Summer Olympics.

References

External links
 

1950 births
Living people
Singaporean female sport shooters
Olympic shooters of Singapore
Shooters at the 1988 Summer Olympics
Place of birth missing (living people)